KTKS is a country music radio station licensed to Versailles, Missouri and broadcasting on 95.1 MHz FM. The station is owned by Dennis Benne, through licensee Benne Broadcasting of Versailles, LLC.

References

External links

Country radio stations in the United States
TKS